Haksar is a Kashmiri Pandit surname and clan. They are native to the Kashmir Valley within the Indian state of Jammu and Kashmir and they have a long tradition of Indian administrative service based on fluency in a link language - Persian under the Mughuls and English under the British. In light of this fact, the Haksar family historically became a prominent administrative family in other parts of India, namely in Indore and Gwalior.

Notable people
Sir Kailash Narain Haksar (1878–1953), Indian minister 
P. N. Haksar (1913–1998), Indian minister
Ajit Narain Haksar (1925–2005), Indian businessman
A. N. D. Haksar (born 1933), Indian diplomat and prominent translator of Sanskrit classics

References

Kashmiri tribes
Kashmiri-language surnames
Indian surnames
Hindu surnames
Social groups of Jammu and Kashmir